Gonocephalus liogaster, the tropical forest dragon, blue-eyed anglehead lizard, or orange-ringed anglehead lizard, is a species of agamid lizard. It is found in Indonesia and Malaysia.

References

Gonocephalus
Reptiles of Indonesia
Reptiles of Malaysia
Reptiles described in 1872
Taxa named by Albert Günther
Reptiles of Borneo
Reptiles of the Malay Peninsula
Fauna of Sumatra